Gaza District was one of the districts of Mandatory Palestine.

In 1939 it consisted of two subdistricts:
 Beersheba Subdistrict
 Gaza Subdistrict

Districts of Mandatory Palestine